Arturo Lussich (6 July 1872, in Montevideo – 22 May 1966)  was a Uruguayan physician and politician.

He belonged to the National Party, for which he candidated several times. In 1916-1917 he was a member of the first National Council of Administration. In 1926 he presided over the Chamber of Deputies.

References

1872 births
1966 deaths
Uruguayan people of Croatian descent
Physicians from Montevideo
20th-century Uruguayan physicians
National Party (Uruguay) politicians
Presidents of the Chamber of Representatives of Uruguay
Uruguayan vice-presidential candidates
Place of death missing